"Dark Is the Night for All" is a song by Norwegian band A-ha, released on 24 May 1993 as the lead single from their fifth studio album, Memorial Beach (1993).

The song, like the rest of Memorial Beach album, was recorded at Prince's Paisley Park Studios. There are two versions of the music video; the first version was banned due to disturbing scenes, including Morten Harket's face ripping through the skin of his abdomen. The second version features more scenes of the band. Overall, the video shows people in various forms of bondage and reflects the dark time A-ha was going through at the time. This was also the last A-ha single to be released in the United States.

Critical reception
A reviewer from Music & Media wrote, "Like Depeche Mode, A-ha is no longer strictly synth. A little bit of rock is injected, while the vocals are Bono-esque." Alan Jones from Music Week said, "The Norwegian former teen idols return, this time sounding rather like a low-rent but pleasant U2 hybrid." He added that the song is "less immediate but more substantial than much of their work", and "a grower that could do very well." Tony Cross from Smash Hits gave it three out of five, commenting, "After disappearing up a Fjord for a few years, Morten is back - as Bono! This U2-esque blockbuster is immediately appealing - with its quiet piano, soft and sad-sounding Morten, and a grand sweeping guitar riff that is immediately likeable." In the review of Memorial Beach, Cross also picked "Dark Is the Night for All" as the "best thing" on the album.

Track listings
 7-inch single
"Dark Is the Night for All" (Album Version) – 3:45
"Angel in the Snow" (Instrumental) – 4:15

 CD 1
"Dark Is the Night for All" – 3:44
"I've Been Losing You"/"Cry Wolf" (Live) – 9:07
"Angel in the Snow" (Instrumental) – 4:15

 CD 2
"Dark Is the Night for All" – 3:45
"The Sun Always Shines on T.V." – 5:06
"Hunting High and Low" (Remix) – 3:38
"Crying in the Rain" – 4:25

Charts

References

1993 singles
1993 songs
A-ha songs
Songs written by Paul Waaktaar-Savoy
Warner Records singles
Songs about nights